Richard Ernest Jackson Jr. (born July 18, 1945) is an American politician, civil servant, and educator from New York. A Republican, Jackson has served as New York State Commissioner of Motor Vehicles, Mayor of Peekskill, New York, and as a member of the Peekskill City Council. 

He is the first African-American to serve as mayor of a city in the history of New York.

Early life
Jackson was born in Peekskill on July 18, 1945.

Career 
Jackson began his career as a mathematics teacher at Peekskill High School.
Jackson later taught calculus at Averill Park High School.

A three-term Peekskill City Councilmember, Jackson was appointed Mayor of Peekskill in December 1984 by a unanimous vote of the City Council when the previous mayor, George Pataki, stepped down to serve in the New York State Assembly. Upon assuming office, he became the first African-American Mayor of Peekskill. According to The New York Times, Jackson was also the first African-American mayor of a city in the State of New York. A Republican, Jackson won a full term as mayor in 1985; he later won re-election to two successive terms with the largest pluralities in the city's 51-year history. He continued to teach mathematics at Peekskill High School while serving in his part-time mayoral post. Jackson stepped down on April 24, 1991.

In 1995, then-Governor Pataki appointed Jackson to the post of New York State Commissioner of Motor Vehicles. Jackson served as Commissioner from 1995 to 2000.

Notes

References

1945 births
Living people
State cabinet secretaries of New York (state)
New York (state) Republicans
Mayors of places in New York (state)
African-American people in New York (state) politics
African-American mayors in New York (state)
African-American state cabinet secretaries
People from Peekskill, New York
21st-century African-American people
20th-century African-American people
Black conservatism in the United States